|}

The Meld Stakes is a Group 3 flat horse race in Ireland open to thoroughbreds aged three years or older. It is run at Leopardstown over a distance of 1 mile and 1 furlong (1,811 metres), and it is scheduled to take place each year in July.

The event was formerly contested over 1 mile and 4 furlongs, and it used to be held at the Curragh in late August or early September. It was previously known as the Brownstown Stakes, and for a period it was restricted to fillies and mares. It was renamed in honour of the successful filly Meld in the 1980s.

The race was reopened to male horses and cut to 1 mile and 2 furlongs in 1993. It was switched to July in 1994. It was transferred to Leopardstown in 2003, and it was shortened to 1 mile and 1 furlong in 2010. The 2014 race was run at the Curragh over 1 mile 2 furlongs. The name Brownstown Stakes is now given to a race at Fairyhouse Racecourse.

Records
Most successful horse (3 wins):
 Famous Name – 2010, 2011, 2012

Leading jockey (8 wins):
 Pat Smullen – Caiseal Ros (1997), Make No Mistake (1999), Muakaad (2001), Famous Name (2010, 2011, 2012), Carla Bianca (2015)
 Kevin Manning -  Idris (1996), Tropical Lady (2005), Heliostatic (2006), Scintillula (2013), Parish Hall (2014), Moonlight Magic (2017), Turret Rocks (2018), Boundless Ocean (2022) 

Leading trainer (9 wins):
 Dermot Weld – Nanticious (1977), Slender Style (1989), Market Booster (1992), Make No Mistake (1999), Muakaad (2001), Famous Name (2010, 2011, 2012), Carla Bianca (2015)
 Jim Bolger -  Idris (1996), Caiseal Ros (1997), Tropical Lady (2005), Heliostatic (2006), Scintillula (2013), Parish Hall (2014), Moonlight Magic (2017), Turret Rocks (2018), Boundless Ocean (2022)

Winners since 1982

Earlier winners

 1961: Foot Note
 1962: Le Prince
 1963: Intaglio
 1964: Horse Power
 1965: Bowzen
 1966: Albinella
 1967: Tartan Slipper
 1968: Wild Goose
 1969: Let's
 1970: Bigaroon
 1971: Ridotto
 1972: Royal Willya
 1973: Belted Earl
 1974: Blood Royal
 1975: Karelina
 1976: Slap Up
 1977: Nanticious
 1978: Relfo
 1979: Red Chip
 1980: My Hollow
 1981: Gilded Vanity

See also
 Horse racing in Ireland
 List of Irish flat horse races

References
 Paris-Turf: 
 Racing Post:

 galopp-sieger.de – Meld Stakes.
 horseracingintfed.com – International Federation of Horseracing Authorities – Meld Stakes (2018).
 irishracinggreats.com – Meld Stakes (Group 3).
 pedigreequery.com – Meld Stakes.

Flat races in Ireland
Open middle distance horse races
Leopardstown Racecourse